Upper Whitman is an unincorporated community in Logan County, West Virginia, United States.

References

Unincorporated communities in Logan County, West Virginia
Unincorporated communities in West Virginia